Bromatometry is a titration process in which the bromination of a chemical indicator is observed.

Potassium bromate alone can be used for the analysis of organoarsenicals.

Notes

See also
 Iodometry

Chemical tests
Titration
Bromine